The women's 58 kg weightlifting event was the second-lightest women's event at the weightlifting competition, limiting competitors to a maximum of 58 kilograms of body mass. The whole competition took place on 6 October at 14:00. This event was the sixth weightlifting event to conclude. The event took  place at the Jawaharlal Nehru Stadium, Delhi.

Results

References

See also 
2010 Commonwealth Games
Weightlifting at the 2010 Commonwealth Games

Weightlifting at the 2010 Commonwealth Games
Common